145534 Jhongda, provisional designation , is an asteroid and member of the stony Merxia family, orbiting in the central region of the asteroid belt, approximately  in diameter. It was discovered by Taiwanese astronomers Yang Tingzhang and Ye Quanzhi at the Lulin Observatory on 1 April 2006. The likely elongated asteroid has a rotation period of 4.5 hours. It was named for the Taiwanese National Central University.

Orbit and classification 

Jhongda is a member of the Merxia family, a large family of stony S-type asteroids named after its parent body 808 Merxia. It orbits the Sun in the central main-belt at a distance of 2.3–3.1 AU once every 4 years and 5 months (1,625 days; semi-major axis of 2.71 AU). Its orbit has an eccentricity of 0.14 and an inclination of 6° with respect to the ecliptic. The first precovery was taken by Spacewatch in February 1992, extending the asteroid's observation arc by 14 years prior to its discovery at the Lulin Observatory.

Naming 

This minor planet was named after the Taiwanese National Central University, which controls the discovering Lulin Observatory. "Jhongda" is the University's abbreviation in Mandarin Chinese. The official  was published by the Minor Planet Center on 2 April 2007.

Physical characteristics 

In January 2014, a rotational lightcurve of Jhongda was obtained from photometric observation by astronomers at the Intermediate Palomar Transient Factory in California. Lightcurve analysis gave a rotation period of  hours with a high brightness variation of 0.67 in magnitude indicative of an elongated, non-spherical shape. The Collaborative Asteroid Lightcurve Link assumes a standard albedo for carbonaceous asteroids of 0.057 and calculates a diameter of 3.54 kilometers with an absolute magnitude of 15.98. Conversely, Jhongda measure only 2.1 kilometers for an albedo of 0.23, which is typical for the stony members of the Merxia family.

References

External links 
 Asteroid Lightcurve Database (LCDB), query form (info )
 Dictionary of Minor Planet Names, Google books
 Discovery Circumstances: Numbered Minor Planets (145001)-(150000) – Minor Planet Center
 
 

145534
Discoveries by Yang Tingzhang
Discoveries by Quanzhi Ye
Named minor planets
20060401